Not Me! is a Canadian drama film, released in 1996. The full-length directorial debut of Pierre Gang, the screenplay had been written by Gang a full 10 years before he was able to make the film.

It stars Richard Moffatt as René, an 11-year-old boy coming of age in 1967. When his father dies shortly after he accidentally witnesses his parents having sex, he becomes overly protective of his widowed mother Reine (Louise Portal) when she enters a new relationship with Roch (Patrice Godin), while simultaneously having his own sexual awakening when the attractive Françoise (Isabelle Pasco) moves into a neighbouring apartment.

The film premiered at the Cannes Film Festival in 1996, before opening commercially in Quebec on May 31.

The film garnered two Genie Award nominations at the 17th Genie Awards in 1996, in the categories of Best Original Screenplay (Gang) and Best Actress (Portal). It won the award for Best Original Screenplay.

The film was Canada's submission for the Academy Award for Best Foreign Language Film at the 69th Academy Awards in 1997, but did not make the final shortlist.

See also
 List of submissions to the 69th Academy Awards for Best Foreign Language Film
 List of Canadian submissions for the Academy Award for Best Foreign Language Film

References

External links 
 

1996 films
1990s coming-of-age drama films
Quebec films
Canadian coming-of-age drama films
1996 directorial debut films
French-language Canadian films
1990s Canadian films